The Red Lodge Commercial Historic District is located in Red Lodge, Montana, between Broadway from 8th to 13th Sts. Its buildings include the Carbon County Courthouse, the Carbon County Hospital and Sanitarium, and the Iris Theater.

The downtown has been redeveloped for historic and cultural tourism. The Carbon County Historic District released its Revitalization Plan for the Historic District in 1986. The buildings in downtown Red Lodge had fallen into disrepair, in large part because population had dropped from its 1915 peak of 6000 people to about 2,000.

As of 2006, an estimate suggests that the population of Red Lodge may increase from about 1,200 people in the winter to over 1,800 people during the summer tourist season, arriving via the Beartooth Highway.
"In early 2006, Red Lodge was selected to become a pilot community in the first year of Montana's new
Main Street program, which is an affiliate of the National Main Street Center. The program is designed
to assist with the economic and historic revitalization of traditional downtown districts."
In 2010, the American Planning Association featured the district as one of its "Great Places in America - Streets."

References

External links 

Gothic Revival architecture in Montana
Romanesque Revival architecture in Montana
Neoclassical architecture in Montana
Historic districts on the National Register of Historic Places in Montana
National Register of Historic Places in Carbon County, Montana
1983 establishments in Montana